Tat language may refer to the following:

Tat language (Caucasus) in Dagestan and Azerbaijan, a southwestern Iranian language, closely related to Persian
Tati (Iran), a group of Northwestern Iranian dialects, including Takestani, closely related to Talysh language

See also
Tati language (disambiguation)